Patrick Coulombe (born April 23, 1985) is a Canadian professional ice hockey defenceman who currently plays for the Ducs d'Angers of the French Ligue Magnus.

Playing career
As a youth, Coulombe played in the 1998 and 1999 Quebec International Pee-Wee Hockey Tournaments with the Rimouski Océanic minor ice hockey team.

Coulombe played junior ice hockey with the Rimouski Océanic of the QMJHL, joining them in 2001. In his draft year of 2002–03, he emerged as a key component of the Océanic blueline and was selected to represent Canada at the IIHF World U18 Championships. However, he was passed over in the 2003 NHL Entry Draft as he was judged to be too small to play defence effectively at the pro level. This would be the first of three times he would be passed over in the draft.

For the 2003–04, Rimouski added junior phenom Sidney Crosby to their roster and instantly became one of the top teams in the QMJHL. Coulombe was a beneficiary of this, as he became a fixture on the Océanic powerplay and his numbers skyrocketed. By 2004–05, Coulombe was one of the highest scoring defenders in the league, finishing with 8 goals and 68 points as Rimouski romped to both the regular-season and playoff QMJHL championships before losing in the Memorial Cup to the London Knights.

In 2005–06, Coulombe was dealt mid-season to the Chicoutimi Saguenéens, as Rimouski began to rebuild after Crosby left for the NHL. He would again set career highs with 23 goals and 77 points, although Chicoutimi failed in their bid to reach the Memorial Cup.

At the conclusion of his junior career, Coulombe signed a pro contract with the Manitoba Moose of the AHL. As the Moose are the minor-pro affiliate of the Vancouver Canucks, Coulombe received an opportunity to attend the Canucks' rookie camp and training camp. Still not considered NHL material before this chance, he surprised Canuck management with his performance and ended up being the team's final cut on the eve of the 2005–06 NHL season.

Coulombe was returned to Manitoba, but signed an NHL contract with the Canucks on October 31, 2006, and was called up to Vancouver when their blueline suffered an injury crunch. He made his NHL debut on November 9, 2006, against the Anaheim Ducks.

Coulombe is a small, quick defender with above-average passing and skating skills. He is especially effective playing the point on the powerplay. Undersized for an NHL defender, he continues to work on his strength in dealing with larger forwards.

On July 1, 2014, Coulombe left the Austrian Hockey League after two seasons with HDD Olimpija Ljubljana and the Graz 99ers to sign a one-year contract with French club, Dragons de Rouen of the Ligue Magnus.

International play
Coulombe represented Canada at the 2003 IIHF World U18 Championships, recording 2 points and a +5 rating in 7 games en route to a gold medal, Canada's first ever in the tournament.

Coulombe was also an invite to the training camp for Canada's entry in the 2005 World Junior Ice Hockey Championships. However, the team was extremely deep owing to the 2004–05 NHL lockout and he was a late cut.

Career statistics

Regular season and playoffs

International

References

External links

1985 births
Living people
Binghamton Senators players
Canadian ice hockey defencemen
Chicoutimi Saguenéens (QMJHL) players
Dragons de Rouen players
Ducs d'Angers players
Elmira Jackals (ECHL) players
Graz 99ers players
HDD Olimpija Ljubljana players
Ice hockey people from Quebec
Manitoba Moose players
Milwaukee Admirals players
People from Bas-Saint-Laurent
Rimouski Océanic players
Undrafted National Hockey League players
Vålerenga Ishockey players
Vancouver Canucks players
Victoria Salmon Kings players